Eagle Talon is a (1989-1998) 2-door 2+2 hatchback coupe

Eagle talon, eagle's talon, talons of eagles, or variation, may refer to:

 The talon (anatomy) of an eagle is part of the claw on the eagle's foot
 The Eagle's Talons, 1923 U.S. film serial
 Talons of the Eagle, 1992 U.S. martial arts film

See also
 Eagle (disambiguation)
 Talon (disambiguation)